Anne Ramsden (born 1952) is a Canadian artist who has exhibited widely in Canada. She is currently based in Montreal, where she is a professor at the Université du Quebec à Montréal.

Life and education 
Ramsden was born in Kingston, Ontario. She received a Bachelor of Arts from Queen's University in 1973, a Bachelor of Fine Arts from Nova Scotia College of Art and Design in 1977, and a Master of Fine Arts from Concordia University in 1983.

Ramsden was a co-founder, along with Francine Perinet and Angela Grauerholz, of the documentation centre and bookstore Artexte and served as co-director from 1980 to 1987.

She served as an associate editor for Parachute Magazine from 1980 to 1982. From 1987 to 1998, Ramsden taught at the School for Contemporary Art at Simon Fraser University. She is a professor at the Université du Quebec à Montréal, where she has taught since 1998.

Artistic practice 
Ramsden works across a variety of media, including sculpture, installation, photography, and video. Ramsden has exhibited widely across Canada. Several notable solo exhibitions include Anastylosis: Inventory, which was exhibited at the Centre Cultural de l'Université de Sherbrooke, Sherbrooke in 2000 and at the Southern Alberta Art Gallery in Lethbridge in 2002; Relations at Artspeak Gallery, Vancouver in 1988; and Urban Geography, shown at the UBC Fine Arts Gallery (now the Morris and Helen Belkin Art Gallery), Vancouver and the Mendel Art Gallery, Saskatoon in 1990.

Ramsden's work has investigated museology and museum display practices, mass media, and the social spaces and visual culture engendered by new technologies. Her multidisciplinary work has been described as bearing an 'obvious feminist thrust.'

Selected works 
Ramsden's series, Relations (1988), consisted of eight photo-diptychs that consider the, "shifting perceptions of the museum itself." Reesa Greenberg writes that the, "doubling, repetition, juxtaposition, shifts in focus and the reflection of a female viewer positioned outside the museum identify the museum as colonist, racist and sexist."

Reclaimed for Mercouri (1987), created for Parachute Magazine, consisted of two photographs of the Elgin Marbles in the British Museum printed on the recto and verso of the same page. The project considers, "the temporal/spatial shift required to see and present art from more than one point of view by drawing a parallel between the physical act of moving through the gallery and the turning of a page."

Robin Laurence describes Ramsden's seven-monitory video installation, Urban Geography, as using, "a strategy of fragmentation and failed communication" in order to convey, "a condition of alienation."

Awards 
In 1993, Ramsden was awarded the Canada Council for the Arts Joseph S. Stauffer Award, which recognizes Canadian artists who exhibit strong artistic potential in music, visual arts, and literature.

Collections 
 Agnes Etherington Gallery, Kingston
 Akademie der Kunste, Berlin
 Burnaby Art Gallery, Burnaby
 Canada Council Art Bank, Ottawa
 Carleton University Art Gallery, Ottawa
 Centre Culturel Canadien, Paris
 Concordia University, Montreal
 Freedman Gallery, Reading
 Morris and Helen Belkin Art Gallery, Vancouver
 National Gallery of Canada, Ottawa
 Oakville Galleries, Oakville
 Vancouver Art Gallery, Vancouver

References

External links 
 Anne Ramsden at Museum of Modern Art

Canadian sculptors
Canadian women artists
Queen's University at Kingston alumni
Concordia University alumni
1952 births
Living people
Members of the Royal Canadian Academy of Arts